Viamala Region is one of the eleven administrative districts in the canton of Graubünden in Switzerland. It was created on 1 January 2017 as part of a reorganization of the Canton.

Mergers
 On 1 January 2018 the former municipality of Mutten merged into the municipality of Thusis.
 On 1 January 2019 the former municipalities of Hinterrhein, Nufenen and Splügen merged into the new municipality of Rheinwald.
 On 1 January 2021 the former municipalities of Casti-Wergenstein, Donat, Lohn and Mathon merged to form the new municipality of Muntogna da Schons.

References

Regions of Graubünden